Bar Facal is a traditional Uruguayan coffeehouse, located at the corner of 18 de Julio avenue and Yí street, Centro, Montevideo, Uruguay. It was founded in 1882 by Galician Manuel Facal and his brothers. It is the oldest Uruguayan downtown bar.

Features  

The coffeehouse was originally a factory for chocolates and quince candy. Outside the bar is a sculpture of Carlos Gardel, and a fountain where tourists leave love locks. An open tango show is performed from Monday to Saturday at 1 pm. 

In 2009, the Departmental Board of Montevideo recognized the contribution of the Bar Facal to the national culture and the national gastronomy with a plaque that is in the wall. There is also a plaque of the Mayor's office in Medellín.

In 2010 a light-emitting diode screen was installed, the first curved screen in the country.

References 

Organizations established in 1882
Drinking establishments in South America
Coffeehouses and cafés
Restaurants in Uruguay